Aniekeme Asuquo Okon (born 8 May 1999) is a Nigerian footballer who plays as a forward for Kano Pillars.

Career statistics

Club

Notes

References

1999 births
Living people
Nigerian footballers
Nigeria youth international footballers
Nigerian expatriate footballers
Association football forwards
Akwa United F.C. players
Altay S.K. footballers
Kano Pillars F.C. players
Nigeria Professional Football League players
Nigerian expatriate sportspeople in Turkey
Expatriate footballers in Turkey
Nigeria under-20 international footballers